"In Fortune's Hand" is a single by Irish group Clannad. It was released in 1990 and was the first single released to promote their album Anam.

Track listing
7" vinyl, 12" vinyl, cassette & 5" compact disc
 "In Fortune's Hand"
 "Dobhar"
 "An Mhaighdean Mhara" (live)

External links

Clannad songs
1990 singles
1990 songs
RCA Records singles
Songs written by Ciarán Brennan